"Pink Houses" is a song written and performed by John Cougar Mellencamp. It was released on 23 October 1983 album Uh-Huh on Riva Records. It reached No. 8 on the US Billboard Hot 100 in early 1984 and No. 15 in Canada. "Pink Houses" was ranked No. 447 on Rolling Stone magazine's list of The 500 Greatest Songs of All Time.

Origins
Recorded in a farmhouse in Brownstown, Indiana, the song was inspired when Mellencamp was driving along an overpass on the way home to Bloomington, Indiana, from the Indianapolis airport.  There was an old black man sitting outside his little pink shotgun house with his cat in his arms, completely unperturbed by the traffic speeding along the highway in his front yard. "He waved, and I waved back," Mellencamp said in an interview with Rolling Stone. "That's how 'Pink Houses' started."

Mellencamp has stated many times since the release of "Pink Houses" that he is unhappy with the song's final verse. At an October 2014 press conference, he stated: "A long time ago, I wrote a song called 'Pink Houses.' Now when I hear that song, all I can think is: 'Why didn't I do a better job on the last verse?' If I had written it today, the last verse would've had more meaning."

Charts

Use in politics
Mellencamp had intended Pink Houses to be a lesson on race, class and survival in America. The repeating line in the chorus of "Ain’t that America" was meant to be sarcastic and cynical. Ironically, the song came to be used in political advertisements and campaign rallies, especially by conservatives.

In 2004, the song was played at events for Senator John Edwards' presidential campaign. The song was also used at events for Edwards' 2008 presidential campaign.

"Pink Houses" along with "Our Country" was played by Senator John McCain at political events for his 2008 presidential campaign. Mellencamp contacted the McCain campaign pointing out Mellencamp's support for the progressive wing of the Democratic Party and questioning McCain's use of his music; in response, the McCain campaign ceased using Mellencamp's songs.

In January 2009, Mellencamp played "Pink Houses" at We Are One: The Obama Inaugural Celebration at the Lincoln Memorial.

In 2010, "Pink Houses" was used by the National Organization for Marriage (NOM) at events opposing same-sex marriage. At Mellencamp's instruction, his publicist sent a cease and desist letter to NOM stating "that Mr. Mellencamp's views on same sex-marriage and equal rights for people of all sexual orientations are at odds with NOM's stated agenda" and requesting that NOM "find music from a source more in harmony with your views than Mr. Mellencamp in the future."

References

1983 singles
1984 singles
John Mellencamp songs
Songs about the United States
Songs written by John Mellencamp
Song recordings produced by Don Gehman
American patriotic songs
1983 songs
Riva Records singles